The Regional State Administrative Agencies are a set of top-level regional organs of the state of Finland, mainly in charge of basic public services and legal permits. Six agencies took over some of the tasks of the earlier provinces of Finland, which were abolished at the end of 2009. A seventh agency in the autonomous area Åland is named the State Department of Åland.

The agencies themselves do not constitute a subdivision of Finland (ISO 3166-2:FI); instead, the first-level subdivisions are the regions of Finland. The other important set of top-level regional state agencies are the Centres for Economic Development, Transport and the Environment (ely-keskus).

Agencies and their regions

See also 
ISO 3166-2:FI
Government Offices for the English Regions

References

External links 
Regional State Administrative Agencies Official site

Government agencies of Finland
Finland geography-related lists
2010 establishments in Finland
Finland politics-related lists